The Santiago ePrix, or, for sponsorship reasons, Antofagasta Minerals Santiago ePrix, is an annual race of the single-seater, electrically powered Formula E championship, held in Santiago, Chile. It was first raced in the 2017–18 season.

Circuits

The first circuit the ePrix was run on was the Santiago Street Circuit, in and around Parque Forestal and other landmarks of the chilean capital, such as the Alameda, Plaza Baquedano, the Gabriela Mistral Cultural Center and the Mapocho River. For the following year, the race was moved inside Parque O'Higgins, the second largest public park of the city, and host of, among other events, the annual music festival Lollapalooza Chile. This was done due to the logistical challenges encountered at the inaugural race, which faced intense opposition from local residents due its use of historical roads through Santiago’s Forestal Park.

Results

References

External links

 
Santiago
Annual sporting events in Chile
Recurring sporting events established in 2018
2018 establishments in Chile